is a Japanese animated short film produced by Jun'ichi Kōuchi in 1917. It was rediscovered by an antique shop employee in Osaka in March 2008.
This film is a 4-minute silent short that tells a story about a foolish rōnin purchase of a dull-edged sword and subsequent attempts at tsujigiri. It was released on June 30, 1917, and is among the very earliest examples of anime.

Plot
 is a short comedic jidaigeki about a dim-witted self-appointed samurai and his worn-down sword which turns completely useless as he tries to fight even the weakest opponents. The samurai, trying to figure out why his old sword cannot cut anyone he strikes, tries desperately to attack random townspeople who defend themselves and knock him out.

References

External links

1910s animated short films
1910s anime films
1910s rediscovered films
1917 animated films
1917 films
1917 short films
Anime short films
Japanese black-and-white films
Japanese silent short films
Rediscovered Japanese films
Samurai in anime and manga